Kenneth Neil Hawks (August 12, 1898 – January 2, 1930) was an American film director and producer.

Life and career
Hawks served in the United States Army Air Service during World War I. He then graduated from Yale University in 1919. He soon moved to Hollywood, California with brother Howard Hawks; He became a writer, editor and supervisor at Fox Films Corporation in 1926. He began directing films for Fox in 1929. He was supervising producer of the Fox documentary film True Heaven (1929). On January 2, 1930, while directing filming of aerial scenes for the film Such Men Are Dangerous, he was killed in a mid-air plane crash over the Pacific Ocean along with 9 others: pilot Walter Ross Cook, cameraman George Eastman, assistant director Ben Frankel, assistant director Max Gold, Tom Harris, Harry Johannes, Otho Jordan, pilot Halleck Rouse, and cinematographer Conrad Wells (also known as Abraham Fried). The planes that crashed into each other were identical Stinson SM-1F Detroiters; sun glare was listed as probable cause.

His body was recovered and after cremation his ashes were scattered over the site of his death.

Family 
He was the brother of director Howard Hawks and producer William Hawks.

Kenneth met actress Mary Astor in 1927; the couple married on February 26, 1928 at her home, Moorcrest. Kenneth gave Astor a new Packard as a wedding gift. They soon moved to a home on Lookout Mountain in Los Angeles, California.

Filmography as director 
 Masked Emotions (1929)
 Big Time (1929)
 Such Men Are Dangerous (1930)

References

External links 
 
 Wedding day photo of Mary Astor and Kenneth Hawks
 Parker v. Granger case details plane crash that killed Kenneth Hawks
 an account of the plane crash that killed Kenneth Hawks et al
 an account of the plane crash that killed Kenneth Hawks et al 
 Kenneth Hawks
 basicfamouspeople Mary Astor
 Davis Monthan Aviation Field Register

1898 births
1930 deaths
People from Goshen, Indiana
Yale University alumni
United States Army Air Service pilots of World War I
Film directors from Indiana
Accidental deaths in California
Victims of aviation accidents or incidents in 1930
Victims of aviation accidents or incidents in the United States